The János Simon Basketball Arena is an indoor arena in Budapest, Hungary. Primarily used for basketball, it is the home arena of Budapesti Honvéd. Since 2012 it bears the name of former European champion basketball player János Simon, who played for and later coached Budapesti Honvéd.

References

Indoor arenas in Hungary
Basketball venues in Hungary